Houkreo Bambe is a Cameroonian wrestler. He competed in the men's freestyle 74 kg at the 1984 Summer Olympics.

References

External links
 

Year of birth missing (living people)
Living people
Cameroonian male sport wrestlers
Olympic wrestlers of Cameroon
Wrestlers at the 1984 Summer Olympics
Place of birth missing (living people)